The Flying Dutchman is a 1923 American silent drama film directed by Lloyd B. Carleton and starring Lawson Butt, Nola Luxford and Ella Hall. It is inspired by the legend of The Flying Dutchman.

Cast
 Lawson Butt as Philip Vanderdecker
 Nola Luxford as 	Melissa
 Ella Hall as 	Zoe
 Edward Coxen as Robert
 Walter Law as Peter Van Dorn

References

Bibliography
 Munden, Kenneth White. The American Film Institute Catalog of Motion Pictures Produced in the United States, Part 1. University of California Press, 1997.

External links
 

1923 films
1923 drama films
American black-and-white films
American silent feature films
Films directed by Lloyd B. Carleton
Film Booking Offices of America films
1920s English-language films
Seafaring films
1920s American films
Silent American drama films
Silent adventure films